The Voyah Zhuiguang (追光) is a full-size luxury car produced by Dongfeng under the Voyah marque.

Overview 

In December 2022, the Chinese electrified vehicle brand Voyah introduced its third model, which was also its first classic passenger car in the form of the Chasing Light luxury limousine. The car was maintained in an aesthetic identical to the Free SUV and Dreamer minivan, distinguished by a slender silhouette with hidden door handles, door ribbing and a gently sloping roofline reminiscent of fastback cars.

The front belt was formed by aggressively shaped headlights, which were joined by a light strip integrated with the company logo formed from LEDs. The rear part of the body was adorned with, among other things, an opening spoiler, while 31 sensors, 12 cameras, 5 radars and 12 ultrasonic sensors ensure movement in semi-autonomous driving mode. The Chasing Light was based on a modular ESSA platform shared with the Free model, which allows, among other things, the flat location of the propulsion system batteries under the passenger cabin. The luxuriously arranged interior was dominated by displays, which also formed an angled touchscreen air conditioning panel. In addition, the dashboard was covered by a strip of three 12.3-inch screens formed successively by digital clocks, a central touchscreen and a passenger touch panel.

The Zhuiguang is set to be set released for early 2023 in Mainland China. The car can be purchased both in traditional form and through a so-called battery subscription model along the lines of the rival NIO. Prices for the luxury limousine start at 322,900 yuan.

Specifications
Unlike previous Voyah models, the Zhuiguang model was created with an all-electric powertrain in mind. Buyers can choose between two battery packs: a smaller 86 kWh offering a range of 580 kilometers (CLTC standard), or a larger 109 kWh allowing up to about 730 kilometers on a single charge.

References 

Voyah Zhuiguang
Cars introduced in 2022
Production electric cars
Luxury vehicles
Limousines
Full-size vehicles
Rear-wheel-drive vehicles
Cars of China